The 2014 Palarong Pambansa (also known as the 2014 PALARO) is the 57th edition of the annual multi-sporting event for Filipino student-athletes. Held in Santa Cruz, Laguna last 10–16 May 2014.

12,000 student-athletes from 17 regions of the Philippines joined this year's Palaro as they compete in various sports.

Bidding 

Five provinces bid for 2014 Palarong Pambansa. These are Laguna, Batangas, Mindoro, Palawan at Marikina. The province of Laguna is the strongest bidder among the five provinces.
Last 23 October 2013, the DepEd or Department of Education held a meeting to announce the host of 2014 Palaro. It was the province of Laguna that was awarded for the hosting of 2014 Palarong Pambansa by the Department of Education regional directors. It was the first time of Laguna to host the Palarong Pambansa and expected to have a grand opening ceremony.

On the other hand, of the same meeting, the city of Marikina was selected to host the 6th ASEAN School Games.

Sports 

The 2014 Palarong Pambansa will feature 17 sports plus the 3 demonstration sports from last year . The 57th edition of the games may introduce wrestling as part of the grassroot program of Philippine Sports Commission. THE Wrestling Association of the Philippines (WAP) will promote the sport in schools nationwide after the Department of Education (DepEd) included wrestling in the 2014 Palarong Pambansa program. President Aquino signed Republic Act 10588, an act institutionalizing the conduct of the Palarong Pambansa, with wrestling as one of the medal sports.

Note:

¹ – demonstration sports in 2013 Palarong Pambansa 
(*) – new sport at the 2014 Palarong Pambansa

Opening 
The opening ceremonies held last 5 May 2014 at the Laguna Sports Complex in Santa Cruz, Laguna, the host venue of the competition. Leading the torch relay of the opening are Filipino ice skater Michael Martinez, basketball players Jeron Teng and Jeric Teng, former swimmer and actor Enchong Dee, and DLSU track & field team captain Jerico Ejercito. Boxing champion Manny Pacquiao did not make it to the event due to the birth of Israel Pacquiao, his & Jinkee's newest baby. Laguna governor E.R. Ejercito together with Manila mayor Joseph Estrada also leads the unveiling of 26-foot-tall monument of Jose Rizal as an Eskrima swordsman, making it the tallest Rizal monument in the world.

Participating regions

Final Medal Tally

Regular Sports

Demonstration Sports

Special Games

Point System by DepEd

References

External links 
Department of Education

Palarong Pambansa
Palarong Pambansa
Palarong Pambansa
Palarong Pambansa
Sports in Laguna (province)